The Stâmnic (also: Chiojd) is a right tributary of the river Bâsca Chiojdului in Romania. It flows into the Bâsca Chiojdului in Cătina.

References

 Starchiojd 

Rivers of Romania
Rivers of Prahova County
Rivers of Buzău County